Second death most commonly refers to an eschatological concept in Judaism and Christianity.

Second death may also refer to:

Film 
 Second Death Star, the second construction of the Death Star, a fictional mobile space station and galactic superweapon featured in the Star Wars space opera franchise
 The Second Death (2000), an Irish short film by John Michael McDonagh

Music 
 Ending Themes (On the Two Deaths of Pain of Salvation), a live album and documentary by Swedish progressive metal band Pain of Salvation, released in 2009
 Second Death (EP), the fourth EP by the extreme metal band Death Requisite, released in 2013